Isobel Anne Gatward  ( Black; born 15 December 1942), known professionally as Isobel Black, is a British actress. She is the daughter of the screenwriter Ian Stuart Black.

Isobel Black attended Queen Elizabeth's Girls' Grammar School in Barnet, Hertfordshire. She is possibly best known for her parts in films such as The Kiss of the Vampire (1963), Twins of Evil (1971) (both horror films made by Hammer), The Magnificent Two (1967) with Morecambe and Wise, David Copperfield (1969), and 10 Rillington Place (1971).

She has also made many appearances on television, including Dixon of Dock Green, Elephant Boy, Danger Man, The Plane Makers, The Avengers, Adam Adamant Lives!, The Troubleshooters, The Spies, Mystery and Imagination, Department S, Ace of Wands, The Capone Investment and The Brief.

As Isobel Gatward, she was awarded the British Empire Medal in the 2017 New Year Honours for her services to the charitable sector, in particular her work for the Mayflower Theatre Trust in Southampton over the previous 30 years.

Filmography

External links
 

1942 births
Living people
Actresses from Edinburgh
People educated at Queen Elizabeth's School for Girls
Scottish television actresses
Recipients of the British Empire Medal